These are the Billboard magazine number-one albums of 1956. These albums were the number-one albums on the Best-Selling Popular Record Albums chart. On March 24, 1956, the name of the chart was changed to Best-Selling Popular Albums. On July 7, 1956, the name was changed again to Best-Selling Pop Albums.

Chart history

See also
1956 in music
List of number-one albums (United States)

References

1956
United States Albums